Mishref is a residential area in Kuwait City, Kuwait, within the Hawalli Governorate, south of Bayan and west of Salwa. Mishref has only 6 blocks (1,2,3,4,5 and 6), and all other blocks or extensions in West Mishref don't originally belong to Mishref.

Mishref is home to:
 A Counsomer co-op by Mishref local residence.
 Al Yarmouk Sporting Club
 A restaurant complex
 Three foreign embassies: the Syrian, Lesotho and Japanese Embassies
 A United Nations (UN) Center
 Two sports open playground which include Basketball, football, handball and tennis courts.

West Mishref is home to:
 Kuwait International Fair, a fairground with eight halls
 The Australian College of Kuwait
 The Gulf University of Science and Technology
 The grand mosque, from which Friday prayers are aired on the state's channels
 A route to Bayan Palace and the Mishref Palace across it

Embassies in Mishref

References

Suburbs of Kuwait City
Areas of Hawalli Governorate